SCM Press is a British publisher of theology, originally linked to the Student Christian Movement. The company was purchased by Hymns Ancient and Modern in 1997.

In 2018 Church Times reported that 100 titles from SCM Press and Canterbury Press lists were being made available to students through the Church of England's digital learning hub, including work by Walter Brueggemann and E. P. Sanders.

The organisation has over 50 publicly available Christian Literature Titles on their website.

See also
 John Bowden (theologian)
 :Category:SCM Press books

References

External links
 

Anglican organizations
Book publishing companies based in London
Christian organisations based in the United Kingdom
Christian organizations established in the 2nd millennium
Christian publishing companies